Colt Canada (formerly called Diemaco) is the Canadian division of American firearms manufacturer Colt located in Kitchener, Ontario, Canada.

The facility produces small arms for the Canadian Armed Forces, Canadian law enforcement agencies In addition, the company exports firearms internationally. Known foreign customers include Norway, Denmark and The Netherlands.

The company's main products are the C7 rifle and derivatives which are manufactured under license from Colt Defense USA, and the EAGLE side-loading 40mm LV grenade launcher.   Colt Canada describes itself as the Canadian government's "Centre of Excellence for small arms" and the Canadian Forces' sole supplier of the C7 family of rifles despite its U.S. ownership and non-affiliation with the Canadian government.

References

External links
Official homepage
Profile Industry Canada

Colt's Manufacturing Company
Companies based in Kitchener, Ontario
Defence companies of Canada
Firearm manufacturers of Canada